James Michael Sarbaugh (born April 25, 1967) is a baseball coach for the Cleveland Guardians of Major League Baseball (MLB). He is a former minor league baseball player and minor league manager for the Columbus Clippers, the Triple-A farm team of the Guardians. He has served as the third base/infielders coach for the Indians since 2013.

Career

Playing career
Sarbaugh attended Lamar University, where he was an all conference shortstop, graduating with a degree in kinesiology.

Sarbaugh played six seasons in the minors, beginning with the Helena Brewers in 1989, then was in the Cleveland Indians' system from 1990 to 1994, where he won a Carolina League championship as a member of the 1991 Kinston Indians.

Additionally, he appeared as an extra in the 1994 movie, Major League II (as J Michael Sarbaugh), playing a shortstop for the Pirates.

Coaching career
Sarbaugh later became a minor league coach, being named the hitting coach for the Kinston Indians in 1995, where the "K-Tribe" was able to win the Carolina League championship that year. He next moved on to the Columbus RedStixx of the South Atlantic League in 1996 and 1997 then was back to Kinston in 1998 and 1999 and also served as the hitting coach for the Akron Aeros from 2000 to 2003.

In 2004, he was named manager of the Mahoning Valley Scrappers leading them to a New York–Penn League championship.

The next season, he managed the Lake County Captains.

In 2006, he became skipper of the Kinston Indians and won the league championship making him a Carolina League champion as a player, coach and manager. His 2006 group was voted the Advanced Class A Team of the Year by both Minor League Baseball and Baseball America. He remained the manager in Kinston for the 2007 campaign, and managed the Carolina League team in the California League/Carolina League All-Star Game held in Stockton, California.

On December 1, 2009, Sarbaugh was named the manager of the Columbus Clippers for the 2010 season.  Sarbaugh won both the 2010 and 2011 Triple-A championships as Clippers' manager.

Cleveland Indians/Guardians
Sarbaugh was named the third base coach/infielders coach for the Cleveland Indians in 2013. During the 2020 season, Sarbaugh filled in as Cleveland's bench coach as Sandy Alomar Jr., the bench coach, filled in for manager Terry Francona, who was away from the team due to a medical condition.

Personal life
Sarbaugh and his wife Nicole live in Shillington, Pennsylvania, with their three children.

References

External links

Article
www.thebaseballcube.com player information on Mike Sarbaugh

1967 births
Living people
Arizona League Brewers players
Beloit Brewers players
Canton-Akron Indians players
Charlotte Knights players
Cleveland Indians coaches
Reno Silver Sox players
Kinston Indians players
Lamar University alumni
Lake County Captains managers
People from Shillington, Pennsylvania
Major League Baseball third base coaches